Jan Laštůvka (born 7 July 1982) is a Czech professional footballer who plays as a goalkeeper for Baník Ostrava.

Career
Laštůvka was born in Havířov. He started his career at Czech side FC Karviná and moved in summer 2000 to FC Baník Ostrava for four years. In 2003, he won the Talent of the Year award at the Czech Footballer of the Year awards. He won the Czech championship with Baník in the 2003–04 season.

Shakhtar Donetsk
The next step in his career was Ukrainian top club Shakhtar Donetsk. He played a couple of Champions League and UEFA Cup matches this time.

Fulham
He joined Fulham on 31 August 2006, just prior to the close of the transfer window. He made his Fulham league debut on 2 December 2006 in a 2–0 loss against Blackburn Rovers.

On 1 January 2007, he came on as a second-half substitute for the injured Antti Niemi against Watford, where throughout the game the Fulham fans cheered his every kick or save, as they feared he would make a mistake and cost them the game. The game ended 0–0. He left Fulham in May 2007 to return to his parent club.

VfL Bochum
Ukrainian League regulations called for all tems to field at least four domestic players each match, and so Shakhtar loaned Laštůvka to German side VfL Bochum until the end of the 2007–08 season as a replacement for compatriot Jaroslav Drobný, who left the club for Hertha BSC Berlin.

Laštůvka started the season as first-choice keeper, but after some mistakes his position was threatened by the reserve keepers. After an injury, then third-choice keeper René Renno got his place. Renno started quite well but also made some mistakes before the winter break, so coach Marcel Koller claimed that all three keepers (Laštůvka, Renno and Philipp Heerwagen) started at zero in the preparations for the second season half. After the winter break Laštůvka was first-choice again and started with a very good match against Werder Bremen, which was rewarded with a nomination in the "Team of the Day" by Germany's leading football magazine kicker. At the end of the season Bochum were interested in signing him, but, due to the €4 million transfer fee, they decided to sign Portuguese keeper Daniel Fernandes from PAOK F.C. instead.

West Ham United
On 3 August 2008 Laštůvka signed for West Ham on a year-long loan deal. He made his debut for West Ham United in a Football League Cup third round tie away defeat at Watford on 23 September. On 26 May 2009, it was announced that Laštůvka was returning to Shakhtar Donetsk, having made only one appearance for West Ham.

Dnipro
On 4 August 2009, Laštůvka signed a three-year deal with Ukrainian team FC Dnipro Dnipropetrovsk for €3 million.

In the summer of 2016, he left Dnipro Dnipropetrovsk.

Czech First League
He rejoined the newly promoted MFK Karviná in the Czech First League as a free agent in 2016. After one year, he moved to SK Slavia Prague on a free transfer to replace Bundesliga-bound Jiří Pavlenka. After only half year later Laštůvka moved back to his former club Baník Ostrava.

International career
Laštůvka was called up to the Czech Republic national football team for the first time in May 2010. He made his full debut at Hampden Park against Scotland in a UEFA Euro 2012 qualifier on 3 September 2011. He was part of the Czech squad which reached the quarter-finals of the tournament before elimination by Portugal, but did not enter the field of play, with Petr Čech playing each match in goal.

Honours
Baník Ostrava
 Czech First League: 2003–04

Shakhtar Donetsk
 Vyshcha Liha: 2004–05, 2005–06
 Ukrainian Super Cup: 2005

Dnipro Dnipropetrovsk
 UEFA Europa League runner-up: 2014–15

References

External links
 Jan Laštůvka at FAČR (in Czech)
 
 

1982 births
Living people
People from Havířov
Czech footballers
Czech Republic youth international footballers
Czech Republic under-21 international footballers
Czech Republic international footballers
Association football goalkeepers
MFK Karviná players
Czech First League players
FC Baník Ostrava players
SK Slavia Prague players
Ukrainian Premier League players
FC Shakhtar Donetsk players
Premier League players
Fulham F.C. players
West Ham United F.C. players
Bundesliga players
VfL Bochum players
FC Dnipro players
Czech expatriate footballers
Expatriate footballers in Ukraine
Expatriate footballers in Germany
Expatriate footballers in England
UEFA Euro 2012 players
Czech expatriate sportspeople in Ukraine
Czech expatriate sportspeople in Germany
Czech expatriate sportspeople in England
Sportspeople from the Moravian-Silesian Region